Hartford Township is one of the 25 townships of Licking County, Ohio, United States. As of the 2010 census the population was 1,431, of whom 1,034 lived in the unincorporated portions of the township.

Geography
Located in the northwestern corner of the county, it borders the following townships:
Hilliar Township, Knox County - north
Milford Township, Knox County - northeast corner
Bennington Township - east
Liberty Township - southeast corner
Monroe Township - south
Harlem Township, Delaware County - southwest corner
Trenton Township, Delaware County - west
Porter Township, Delaware County - northwest corner

The village of Hartford is located in the center of the township.

Name and history
Statewide, the only other Hartford Township is located in Trumbull County.

Government
The township is governed by a three-member board of trustees, who are elected in November of odd-numbered years to a four-year term beginning on the following January 1. Two are elected in the year after the presidential election and one is elected in the year before it. There is also an elected township fiscal officer, who serves a four-year term beginning on April 1 of the year after the election, which is held in November of the year before the presidential election. Vacancies in the fiscal officership or on the board of trustees are filled by the remaining trustees.

References

External links

County website

Townships in Licking County, Ohio
Townships in Ohio